Italian ratings may refer to:
Motion picture rating system in Italy
Television content rating systems used in Italy